Supak Jomkoh (born 4 September 1996) is a Thai badminton player affiliated with SCG academy who plays both in the mixed and men's doubles.

Achievements

BWF International Challenge/Series (5 titles, 1 runner-up) 
Men's doubles

Mixed doubles

  BWF International Challenge tournament
  BWF International Series tournament
  BWF Future Series tournament

References

External links 
 
 

1996 births
Living people
Supak Jomkoh
Supak Jomkoh
Supak Jomkoh